Gary Joseph Houston (né Garland; born October 12, 1957) is an American former professional basketball player for the Denver Nuggets in the National Basketball Association (NBA). He played one season with the Nuggets (1979–80). Gary is the half-brother of superstar singer Whitney Houston and also half-brother to Michael Houston. Gary, Michael, and Whitney are the children of singer Cissy Houston. Gary is the cousin of singers Dionne Warwick and Dee Dee Warwick and the uncle of Bobbi Kristina Brown, Whitney's daughter with singer Bobby Brown. Garland has toured several times as a background singer and an occasional duet partner with Whitney Houston. Garland has also studied at DePaul University.

Work as a vocalist
After being released by the NBA's Denver Nuggets in 1980 for failing a drug test, Garland participated with his then-newly famous superstar sister, R&B/pop singer Whitney Houston, on her Greatest Love Tour in 1986 as a background/duet vocalist. This led to a continuous work relationship with Whitney. He performed as a background singer in several of Whitney's tours throughout the 1980s, 1990s, 2000s, and her 2010's Nothing But Love Tour.

Whitney Houston tours that included Gary Garland
The Greatest Love World Tour (1986)
Moment of Truth World Tour (1987–88)
I'm Your Baby Tonight World Tour (1991)
The Bodyguard World Tour (1993–94)
Pacific Rim Tour (1997)
The European Tour (1998)
My Love Is Your Love World Tour (1999)
Soul Divas Tour (2004)
Nothing But Love World Tour (2010)

References

External links 

1957 births
Living people
African-American basketball players
American men's basketball players
Basketball players from New Jersey
Denver Nuggets draft picks
Denver Nuggets players
DePaul Blue Demons men's basketball players
Point guards
Sportspeople from East Orange, New Jersey
20th-century African-American sportspeople
20th-century African-American male singers
21st-century African-American male singers